Fangfoss is a village and civil parish in the East Riding of Yorkshire, England. The parish includes Bolton. The civil parish is called "Fangfoss" and its parish council is called "Fangfoss with Bolton Parish Council" after Bolton parish was abolished on 1 April 1935 and merged with Fangfoss. In 2011 it had a population of 581, a decrease on the 2001 UK census figure of 602.

In 1823 Fangfoss was listed as the parish of 'Fangfoss-with-Spittle'. The village was in the Wapentake of Harthill. Population was 154, with occupations including twelve farmers, a shopkeeper, a shoemaker, and a schoolmaster. The landlord of The Carpenter's public house was also a village carpenter. The village chapel was in the charge of the vicar of Barnby-upon-the-Moor, and under the patronage of the Dean of York.

The parish church of St Martin was designated a Grade II* listed building in January 1967 and is now recorded in the National Heritage List for England, maintained by Historic England.

Fangfoss Hall was designated a Grade II* listed building in 1967 and is now recorded in the National Heritage List for England, maintained by Historic England.

Fangfoss was served by Fangfoss railway station on the York to Beverley Line between 1847 and 1959. In 1987 the station was given a Grade II listed building status.

In addition to the parish church, Fangfoss has a primary school and pub called The Carpenters Arms. A village park was created in 2002 to mark the Queen's Golden Jubilee and is called Jubilee Park.

Fangfoss hosts an annual arts festival called Fangfest.

References

External links

Villages in the East Riding of Yorkshire
Civil parishes in the East Riding of Yorkshire